The German Historical Institute Moscow is a history institute of the Max Weber Stiftung based in Moscow, Russia. The founding director was Bernd Bonwetsch, the director as of 2016 is Nikolaus Katzer.

See also
Germany–Russia relations

References 

German Historical Institutes
Organizations based in Moscow
Russian studies
Historiography of Russia
Historiography of Germany
Germany–Russia relations
2005 establishments in Russia